Chrysophyllum venezuelanense is a tree in the family Sapotaceae, native to the tropical Americas.

Description
The fruit is yellow.

Distribution and habitat
Chrysophyllum venezuelanense is native to Mexico, Central America and tropical South America including Brazil. Its habitat is mainly in lowland forests.

Uses
The fruit of Chrysophyllum venezuelanense is edible. The timber is used in construction and for fences.

References

venezuelanense
Flora of Mexico
Flora of South America
Plants described in 1891
Taxa named by Jean Baptiste Louis Pierre